Paratrygon aiereba (also known as discus ray, manzana ray or ceja ray) is a cartilaginous fish in the family  Potamotrygonidae from the Amazon basin in South America.

Appearance 
This freshwater ray has small eyes and a disc shaped roughly like a lily pad (the snout is slightly concave). It is brownish above with a dark vermiculated or reticulated pattern. There are unconfirmed claims of much larger individuals, but these are considered highly questionable.

Behavior 
It mainly feeds on fish, but also take invertebrates such as insects and crustaceans, and it is a top predator in its habitat. Adults are found in relatively deep waters in main river channels, but move to shallower waters to feed at night. Juveniles are found in relatively shallow waters at sandy beaches and in creeks.

References 

Fish described in 1841